Dean Faulkner Wells (March 22, 1936 – July 27, 2011) was an American author, editor, and publisher.

Personal life
Dean Faulkner Wells was born on March 22, 1936, four months after her father, Dean Swift Faulkner, died in a plane crash.  Dean Swift Faulkner,  a pilot, was the younger brother of William Faulkner.  Wells was adopted by her uncle, William Faulkner, whom she knew as Pappy, after her father's death and he became her legal guardian.  William Faulkner lived in Oxford, Mississippi, on his 29-acre "Rowan Oak" estate. 

Wells was educated at the University of Mississippi and University of Geneva, Switzerland.

She was married to Larry Wells, with whom she started the Yoknapatawpha Press Faulkner Contest.  She had three children by her first marriage: Diane, Paige and Jon.

Career
Dean Faulkner Wells and her second husband, Lawrence Wells, were co-owners of Yoknapatawpha Press, an independent press in Oxford, Mississippi. They co-founded the Faux Faulkner parody contest. Wells compiled a number of the parodies in The Best of Bad Faulkner. The couple also published a quarterly journal, The Faulkner Newsletter and Yoknapatawpha Review, devoted to the life and work of William Faulkner. From 1985 to 1988 Wells was a contributing editor for Southern Magazine. Her articles were published in The Paris Review, Parade Magazine, Ladies Home Journal and Southern Review.

Wells wrote and edited eight books—the last of which was an autobiography, Every Day by the Sun: A Memoir of the Faulkners of Mississippi, published by Crown in March 2011, four months before she died. Every Day by the Sun   is about Wells’ growing up in a literary family whose identity was shaped by its most famous member, William Faulkner. Wells based her memoir on 35 years of research  with family members and friends, as well as a lifetime of memories and family stories of her uncle, William Faulkner, her grandmother, Maud Butler Falkner, and her mother, Louise Meadow.

Wells wrote to her editor, "In the spring of 2008 I found myself  the oldest surviving Faulkner of my generation, the last primary source and blood relative who could say ‘I was there,’ or ‘I remember when.’ It has taken seventy-plus years for me to summon up the discipline and courage to undertake this project. It isn't easy to write an autobiography when one grew up as a tadpole in a pond with a bull frog named William Faulkner."

Death
Dean Faulkner Wells died July 27, 2011, at the Baptist Medical Center-North Mississippi in Oxford, due to complications of a stroke.  She was 75.

Published works

Book author
  Translations: Japanese, French, Spanish, Catalan, Italian.
 
 ; illustrated children's book about the ducks at the Peabody Hotel in Memphis.

Book editor
 ; an anthology of essays about prominent Mississippians.
 
 
 ; collected parodies of the international Faux Faulkner Contest.

Articles

See also
 William Cuthbert Faulkner

References

External links
 
 

 
 

Writers from Mississippi
1936 births
2011 deaths